Alive may refer to:
Life

Books, comics and periodicals
 Alive (novel), a 2015 novel by Scott Sigler
 Alive: The Final Evolution, a 2003 shonen manga by Tadashi Kawashima and Adachitoka
 Alive: The Story of the Andes Survivors, a 1974 book by Piers Paul Read
 Alive (magazine), a monthly Canadian natural health magazine
 Alive! (newspaper), an Irish Catholic newspaper

Film
 Alive (1993 film), a film by Frank Marshall based on the book Alive: The Story of the Andes Survivors
 Alive: 20 Years Later, a 1993 documentary about the book Alive: The Story of the Andes Survivors and the Frank Marshall film
 Alive (2002 film), a Japanese horror film by Ryuhei Kitamura based on the manga ALIVE
 Alive, a 2003 DVD by Audio Adrenaline
 Alive (2006 film), a Russian film by Aleksandr Veledinsky
 Alive (Meshuggah video), a 2010 concert film
 Alive (2014 film), a South Korean film by Park Jung-bum
 Alive, a 2016 Overwatch animated short film
 #Alive (2020 film), a South Korean film by Cho Il-hyung
 Alive Films, an American production company co-founded by Carolyn Pfeiffer

Music

Albums
 Alive (10cc album), 1993
 Alive (3rd Party album), 1997
 Alive!! (Becca album), 2008
 Alive (Big Bang album) or the title song, 2012
 Alive (Bruce Dickinson album), 2005
 Alive (Chick Corea album), 1991
 Alive (Do As Infinity album) or the title song, 2018
 Alive (Dr. Sin album), 1999
 Alive (Ed Kowalczyk album), 2010
 Alive! (Grant Green album), 1970
 Alive (Hiromi album) or the title song, 2014
 Alive (Jacky Terrasson album), 1998
 Alive (Jessie J album) or the title song, 2013
 Alive (Kate Ryan album) or the title song (see below), 2006
 Alive (Kim Kyung-ho album), 2009
 Alive! (Kiss album), 1975
 Alive (Nitty Gritty Dirt Band album), 1969
 Alive (Rising Appalachia album), 2017
 Alive (Sa Dingding album) or the title song, 2007
 Alive (Shawn Desman album) or the title song, 2013
 Alive! (Snot album), 2002
 Alive! (Turbo album), 1986
 Alive (in concert), by Axelle Red, 2000
 Alive! The Millennium Concert, by Kiss, 2006
 Kenny Loggins Alive, 1980
 Alive or the title song, by Ben Haenow, 2018
 Alive, by Cimorelli, 2016
 Alive, by Crystal Bowersox, 2017
 Alive, by Julie Roberts, 2011
 Alive 1997, by Daft Punk
 Alive 2007, by Daft Punk

Mixtapes
 Alivë  by Yeat, 2021

EPs
 Alive (Adler's Appetite EP) or the title song, 2012
 Alive (Big Bang EP) or the title song, 2012
 Alive, by Target, 2018

Songs
 "Alive" (Beastie Boys song), 1999
 "Alive" (Bee Gees song), 1972
 "Alive" (Black Eyed Peas song), 2009
 "Alive" (Breed 77 song), 2006
 "Alive" (Chase & Status song), 2013
 "Alive" (Dami Im song), 2013
 "Alive" (Empire of the Sun song), 2013
 "Alive" (Goldfrapp song), 2010
 "Alive" (Jennifer Lopez song), 2002
 "Alive" (Kate Ryan song), 2006
 "Alive" (Krewella song), 2013
 "Alive" (Lo-Pro song), 2010
 "Alive" (Melissa O'Neil song), 2005
 "Alive!" (Mondotek song), 2007
 "Alive" (Natalie Bassingthwaighte song), 2008
 "Alive" (Pearl Jam song), 1991
 "Alive" (P.O.D. song), 2001
 "Alive" (Rebecca St. James song), 2005
 "Alive" (Rüfüs Du Sol song), 2021
 "Alive" (S Club song), 2002
 "Alive" (Sia song), 2015
 "Alive" (Sonique song), 2003
 "Alive" (Vincent Bueno song), 2020
 "Alive"/"Physical Thing", by Koda Kumi, 2009
 "Alive", by Adelitas Way from Home School Valedictorian, 2011
 "Alive", by Breed 77 from In My Blood (En Mi Sangre), 2006
 "Alive", by Cheap Trick from The Latest, 2009
 "Alive", by Daft Punk from The New Wave, 1994
 "Alive", by Dala from Everyone Is Someone, 2009
 "Alive", by Drugstore, 1993
 "Alive", by Edwin from Another Spin Around the Sun, 1999
 "Alive", by Gravity Kills from Perversion, 1998
 "Alive", by Hawk Nelson from Live Life Loud, 2009
 "Alive", by Jennifer Brown, 1998
 "Alive", by Khalid from Free Spirit, 2019
 "Alive", by Kid Cudi from Man on the Moon: The End of Day, 2009
 "Alive", by Korn from Neidermayer's Mind, 1993
 "Alive", by Leona Lewis from Echo, 2009
 "Alive", by Meat Loaf from Bat Out of Hell III: The Monster Is Loose, 2006
 "Alive", by Milky Chance from Blossom, 2017
 "Alive", by Monni, 2019
 "Alive", by Mýa from K.I.S.S. (Keep It Sexy & Simple), 2011
 "Alive", by Oasis from Shakermaker, 1994
 "Alive", by One Direction from Midnight Memories, 2013
 "Alive", by Ozzy Osbourne from Down to Earth, 2001
 "Alive", by Shihad from Love Is the New Hate, 2005
 "Alive", by Sick Individuals, 2016
 "Alive", by SR-71 from Now You See Inside, 2000
 "Alive", by Steve Aoki, 2017
 "Alive", by Wage War from Blueprints, 2015
 "Alive", by X Japan from Vanishing Vision, 1988
 "Alive!", from the musical Jekyll & Hyde, 1997
 "Alive", from the video game The Idolmaster Dearly Stars, 2009
 "Alive (N' Out Of Control)", by Papa Roach from The Paramour Sessions, 2006

 Events 
 Alive 2006/2007, a concert tour by Daft Punk
 Alive! Tour, a 1975–1976 concert tour by Kiss
 Alive Festival, a Christian music festival in Mineral City, Ohio, US

 Other music 
 Alive Naturalsound Records, a record label
 "Alive", a television news music package by 615 Music

 Other uses 
 "Alive!" (Cow and Chicken), a television episode
 "Alive!" (Justice League Unlimited), a television episode
 Alive 90.5, a radio station based in Sydney, Australia
 Alive, a 1998 PlayStation video game developed by General Entertainment

See also

 Alive 1997, 2001 Daft Punk live album
 Alive 2007'', 2008 Daft Punk live album
 
 Life (disambiguation)
 Live (disambiguation)
 Living (disambiguation)